Ralph Bacerra (1938, Garden Grove, California - June 10, 2008) was a ceramic artist and career educator. He lived and worked in Los Angeles, California.

From 1959 to 1961, Bacerra was a student at Chouinard Art Institute in Los Angeles, where he studied under the celebrated ceramist and educator and Vivika Heino. Bacerra joined the U.S. Army in 1961, returning in 1963 to find the position of chairperson of the ceramics department at Chouinard left open by Vivika Heino. Bacerra occupied this position there from 1963 to 1971, at which point Chouinard was renamed the California Institute of the Arts and moved to Valencia, California. After this move in 1971, the ceramics department was dropped from the school's curriculum, and Bacerra went to work full-time in his studio. Bacerra is credited with important technological innovation in advanced ceramics, most notably resulting in his development of oven-top ranged surfaces for the Induction Stove Corporation that featured the use of electromagnetic induction. Bacerra returned to teaching in 1983, this time accepting an offer from the Otis Art Institute to be chairperson of the ceramics department. This department was founded at Otis by influential artist Peter Voulkos. Bacerra was chair of this program until 1997. His teaching approach focused more on the development of technical proficiency and experience with materials than on conceptual concerns. He had only one kidney.

The artwork of Ralph Bacerra is recognizable by its vivid use of color and contrast, which are the result of a delicate and multi-staged process of overglazing. He is also known for geometrically complicated and technically difficult forms. His decorative aesthetic draws from Asian sources, most notably Japanese Imari and Kutani pieces, Persian miniatures, and Chinese Tang ceramics. The surface imagery of Bacerra's sculptures is design-conscious and draws comparisons to M.C. Escher's grid techniques and use of positive and negative space, as well as to the geometric sensibility and creation of movement and space associated with Vassily Kandinsky. Bacerra has insisted upon an absence of metaphor:

"I've never really thought of my work in post-modern terms. But I suppose in many ways it fits the definition. My pieces are based on traditional ideas and engage in certain cultural appropriations—in form, in design, in glaze choices. However, my work is not post-modern in the sense that I am not making any statements—social, political, conceptual, even intellectual. There's no meaning or metaphor. I'm committed more to the idea of pure beauty. The finished piece should be like an ornament, exquisitely beautiful."

He died of lung cancer Tuesday, June 10, 2008, at his home in Eagle Rock, near Los Angeles.

Collections

Arizona State University Art Museum, Tempe
Bates Gallery, Edinboro State College, Edinboro, Pennsylvania
Cooper Hewitt Museum, New York
Everson Museum of Art, Syracuse, New York
John Michael Kohler Arts Center, Sheboygan, Wisconsin
Krannet Art Museum, Champaign, Illinois
Long Beach Museum of Art, Long Beach, California
Los Angeles County Museum of Art, Los Angeles
M.H. de Young Memorial Museum, San Francisco
Mint Museum of Craft + Design, Charlotte, North Carolina
The Museum of Contemporary Ceramic Art, Shigaraki Ceramic Cultural Park, Shigaraki, Japan
Museum of Contemporary Crafts, New York
Smithsonian American Art Museum, Washington, D.C.
National Museum of Modern Art, Kyoto, Japan
Newark Museum of Art, Newark, New Jersey
The Oakland Museum, Oakland, California
Racine Art Museum, Racine, Wisconsin
Syracuse University, Syracuse, New York
Victoria and Albert Museum, London
The White House, Washington, D.C.
Wichita Art Museum, Wichita, Kansas

Sources

Further reading

 Herman, Lloyd E. Art that Works: Decorative Arts of the Eighties Craft In America. Seattle: University of Washington Press, 1990.
 Lauria, Jo. Color and Fire: Defining Moments in Studio Ceramics, 1950–2000.  Los Angeles County Museum of Art: Rizzoli International Publications, Inc. 2000.
 Levin, Elaine. The History of American Ceramics from Pipkins and Bean Pots to Contemporary Forms. New York City: Harry N. Abrams, 1988.

External links
Frank Lloyd Gallery: website of gallery representing Ralph Bacerra, with images of work, résumé, etc.
Ralph Bacerra papers, 1959-2003 from the Smithsonian Archives of American Art

1938 births
2008 deaths
Sculptors from California
American ceramists
Chouinard Art Institute alumni
Deaths from lung cancer in California
20th-century American sculptors
20th-century American male artists
American male sculptors
People from Garden Grove, California
20th-century American ceramists